The 2017 Asian Fencing Championships were held in Hong Kong from 15 to 20 June 2017 at the Asia World Expo.

Medal summary

Men

Women

Medal table

Results

Men

Individual épée

Team épée

Individual foil

Team foil

Individual sabre

Team sabre

Women

Individual épée

Team épée

Individual foil

Team foil

Individual sabre

Team sabre

References

 Results

External links 
 Official website

Asian Fencing Championships
Asian Championship
Asian Fencing Championships
International sports competitions hosted by Hong Kong
June 2017 sports events in Asia